Two ships of the Royal Norwegian Navy have borne the name HNoMS Trygg. Trygg is Norwegian for safe, secure, dependable:

  was a  launched in 1919, sunk by German aircraft in 1940. Salvaged the same year by the Germans, she was sunk by British aircraft in 1944.
  was a  fast patrol boat launched in the 1960s.

Royal Norwegian Navy ship names